And Then... is the fifth studio album by  American recording artist Joe, released  through Jive Records on December 2, 2003 in the United States. It features production by Joe's labelmate R. Kelly as well as Roy "Royalty" Hamilton, Kevin "Shekspere" Briggs, Carvin & Ivan, The Underdogs, and others. The album reached number 26 on the US Billboard 200 chart, selling 121,000 copies in its first week of release. It was eventually certified gold by the Recording Industry Association of America (RIAA).

Background 
And Then... is an album that focuses on ballads. Joe states on his web site that he prefers singing ballads to up-tempo tracks. "I prefer to sing on ballads rather than up-tempos. You kind of showcase yourself as an r&b singer a lot better." The album also features a number of collaborations with prominent r&b writers and producers. Joe worked with labelmate R. Kelly on the lead single "More & More" and "Make You My Baby", these two songs were originally intended for R. Kelly's unreleased album "Loveland". Roy "Royalty" Hamilton worked with Joe on the title track, as well as "Sweeter than Sugar" and "Sweet Dreams". Songwriter Kevin "Shekspere" Briggs wrote the song "Bedroom" that appears late on the album. G-Unit appears on the track "Ride wit U". Produced by Frank Romano, which is one of the up-tempo tracks on the album — Joe returned the favour on their debut album.

Critical reception 

Upon release, And Then... received generally positive reviews from music critics. Allmusic wrote that "Joe maintains his steady recording output with And Then..., another in a line of his generally solid if not overly exceptional albums highlighted by a couple standout cuts [...] Here he's in really good hands, especially on the aforementioned Kelly and Hamilton songs, which rank among the very best of his career. They rated the album three and a half stars out of five.

Commercial success 
And Then... debuted at number 26 on the US Billboard 200 and number four on Billboards Top R&B/Hip-Hop Albums chart, selling 121,000 copies in its first week of release. It was eventually certified gold by the Recording Industry Association of America (RIAA). Outside the United States, the album reached the top thirty on the Dutch MegaCharts.

R. Kelly-produced lead single "More & More" reached number 15 on Billboards Hot R&B/Hip-Hop Songs, while first international single "Ride wit U" peaked at number 22 on the same chart. It also reached number 12 on the UK Singles Chart  and the top forty of the Australian Singles Chart, becoming his highest-charting single release since 2000's "Stutter". Third single "Priceless" reached number 72 on the Hot R&B/Hip-Hop Songs chart.

Track listing 

Notes
  signifies a co-producer

Sampling credits
 "Sweeter Than Sugar" contains a sample from "The Makings of You" by Gladys Knight & The Pips. 
 "Street Dreams" samples from "Never Gonna Stop" by Linda Clifford, "Street Dreams" by Nas, and "All Eyez on Me" by 2Pac.

Charts

Weekly charts

Year-end charts

Certifications

References 

2003 albums
Joe (singer) albums
Jive Records albums
Albums produced by R. Kelly
Albums produced by the Underdogs (production team)